The Xavier Institute of Engineering (XIE), a sister institution of 
St. Xavier College, Mumbai, Fort, is an engineering college in central Mumbai, established in the year 2005 to give
a quality technical education to all, with a preferential option for economically backward and Christians

. The institute is managed by the Society of Jesus, Jesuits, and is affiliated to Mumbai University,
approved by AICTE New Delhi, and recognized by Directorate of Technical Education, Government of Maharashtra
. XIE is a member of AJIT, the Association of Jesuit
Institutes of Technology

and IAJES (International Association of Jesuit Engineering Schools)  . It is accredited by National Assessment and Accreditation Council of India
. Since XIE is affiliated to Mumbai University, it follows its syllabus and examination system.

It began in the early 1930s as a technical institute on the premises of St. Xavier College, Mumbai providing basic 
professional courses

. In 2005 it became a polytechnic founded in Mahim, near what was called "Fishermen's Colony", a
fifteen-minute walk from the Mahim Junction Railroad Station. At the same time, the Xavier Institute of Engineering (XIE) was started
on the same premises.

XIE offers an undergraduate degree course in Engineering (B.E.) in Electronics and Telecommunication Engineering (60 seats), 
Computer Engineering (60 seats), Computer Science and Engineering (Cyber Security, IoT with Block Chain Technology) (60 seats), and Information Technology (60 seats). XIE also offers Honours Degree Program in Artificial Intelligence (AI) and Machine Language (ML) for all the branches. 
. There is one-year diploma course in Sound Engineering
(20 seats). In collaboration with Marquette University, XIE has set up the "Gait Lab", where a person's walk is captured in 3-D
imaging
 and to which Government hospitals are sending children to seek help as it is the only lab in Mumbai City
.

Staff
Since 2018, its director is Fr. Dr. John Rose, S.J., who holds a Master's in Physics from Loyola College (Madras University) and
in Computer Engineering from Santa Clara University, USA.  His Ph.D. degree is in Electrical Engineering, also from 
Santa Clara University.
Since 2010, the principal is Dr. Y.D. Venkatesh, a mechanical engineer, who holds a master's degree from IIT Mumbai and a Ph.D. from 
Mumbai University.
The college has 45 faculty members and 51 non-teaching staff in all the branches.

Recognition
The Knowledge Review placed XIE under the top 10 most prominent institutes in Maharashtra in 2019 
and the Higher Education Review under the top 20 promising institutes in Maharashtra in 2018.  
The Times of India newspaper listed XIE among 30 institutions with high perceptual score in 2018 
. The Higher Education Digest put XIE into a list of 50 must watch engineering colleges in India

Activities
The institute sends students to go in rural areas on a regular basis to share their skills with school children in village
boarding establishments. It organizes three festivals each year, namely Spandan for cultural expression, SparX for sports, 
and Transmission for technology.

See also
 List of Jesuit sites

References

Jesuit universities and colleges in India
All India Council for Technical Education
Engineering colleges in Mumbai
Affiliates of the University of Mumbai
Educational institutions established in 2005
2005 establishments in Maharashtra